Farci is an Italian surname. Notable people with the surname include:

 Giampaolo Farci (born 1937), Italian field hockey player
 Luigi Farci (born 1939), Italian field hockey player
 Patrizia Farci, Italian scientist and hepatologist

Italian-language surnames